"Blind Balance" is the 17th television play episode of the first season of the Australian anthology television series Australian Playhouse. "Blind Balance" was written by Monte Miller and originally aired on ABC on 8 August 1966.

Plot
The Blind Balance of Justice weighs out the lives and destinies of two young people, Shirleen and James, whose meeting has brought about personal tragedy.

Cast
 Julie Costello
 Allen Bickford
 Brian James
 Margaret Cruikshank
 Lloyd Cunnington

Reception
The Sydney Morning Herald said it was "enjoyable... in a bitter kind of way."

References

External links
 
 
 

1966 television plays
1966 Australian television episodes
1960s Australian television plays
Australian Playhouse (season 1) episodes